Qaleruaqia, known only from the Aftenstjernesø Formation, Lauge Koch Land, North Greenland is considered the earliest fossil aculiferan. The type species, Q. sodermanorum, was named and described in 2020.

References

Chitons
Cambrian molluscs
Fossil taxa described in 2020
Cambrian genus extinctions